Tony Drago (born 22 September 1965) is a Maltese former professional snooker and pool player.

Known for his speed around the table, during his snooker career he won two professional titles: the 1993 Strachan Challenge Event 3 and the 1996 Guangzhou Masters. He later switched his focus to pool and won the 2003 World Pool Masters beating Hsia Hui-kai 8–6 and the 2008 Predator International 10-ball Championship beating Francisco Bustamante 13–10.

Snooker career

Drago's highest snooker world rankings position was number ten (in 1998). He has reached two major finals – the 1991 World Masters (losing to Jimmy White), and the 1997 International Open (beaten by Stephen Hendry—Drago's only ranking event final, and his first run past the quarter-finals of any ranking event). He reached the quarter-finals of the World Championship in 1988. He has appeared in the tournament 11 further times, most recently in 2004/2005, with five further last-sixteen runs. He lost to Matthew Stevens in three successive years – 8–13 in the last 16 in 1999, 2–10 in the 2000 first round, and 1–10 in the 2001 first round.

After he failed to qualify for the 2004 World Championship, Drago's snooker form slumped badly. He dropped out of the top 32 of the rankings a year later, and, after losing to Issara Kachaiwong in his opening qualifier for the 2008 World Championship, he dropped off the tour.

In 2009, Drago won the EBSA International Open, which gave him the chance to return for the 2009–10 season. He reached the third qualifying round of the Shanghai Masters, Grand Prix, and 2009 UK Championship. He then qualified for the Welsh Open, by defeating Simon Bedford (5–3), Peter Lines (5–2), Jimmy Michie (5–2), and Gerard Greene (5–2), where he played against Ryan Day in the first round, but he lost 4–5. In the China Open qualifying, Drago defeated Lee Page (5–2), John Parrott (5–2), Anthony Hamilton (5–4), and Stephen Lee (5–2), to qualify for the televised stages of the China Open. As a result of such a solid season, he got a place in the top 64 and finished 54th.

2010/2011 was again a good season for Drago, as he climbed 8 places to finish 46th in the rankings. However, the 2011/12 season was much worse, with only four qualifying wins to his name. His best results were reaching the last 32 of several of the PTC events. After unexpectedly losing 7–10 to amateur Justin Astley in the 2012 World Snooker Championship qualifiers, Drago finished the season ranked 65th, not making it into the top 64 guaranteeing their place for the next season; however, he was given a wildcard for the next season as a European nomination, along with young Luca Brecel. Drago could not qualify for any of the ranking events during the 2012–13 season. He made headlines in his qualifying match against Alan McManus for the German Masters, when, upon being told he would be fined £250 for conceding the match early, he slapped himself in the face a number of times. Drago finished the year ranked world number 82.

His first match of the season was against Adam Duffy in the qualifying round for the 2013 Wuxi Classic; Drago lost the match 2–5. In the qualifying rounds for the 2013 Australian Goldfields Open, Drago defeated Christopher Keogan 5–2 and Thepchaiya Un-Nooh 5–4, making a crucial 75 break in the deciding frame. In the third qualifying round, Drago was trailing Tian Pengfei 1–3, before winning four consecutive frames, including a 111 break, to win the match 5–3; however, he lost in the final qualifying round 3–5 to Ryan Day, despite leading 2–0 and 3–2.

Drago lost his place on the tour at the end of the 2015/16 season and he failed to qualify for the main tour in that season's Q School.

In 2020 Drago was once again selected for the Seniors World Championship. However, on the counsel of his personal doctor, he refused the offer due to the COVID-19 pandemic ongoing at the time.

Pool career
Drago's first major pool win was the 2003 World Pool Masters, which came just a few weeks after a run to the semi-finals of that year's World Pool Championship.

Drago was member of the winning European team at the 2007 and 2008 Mosconi Cup. At 2007 in Las Vegas, Drago won all of his single matches which earned him the Most Valuable Player Award.

In 2008, Drago won the Predator International 10-ball Championship, beating Francisco Bustamante 13–10.

Accomplishments
Drago is well known for the speed of his play, and holds a number of records resulting from this. In 1993 he recorded the fastest ever best-of-9-frames snooker victory by beating Sean Lanigan in just thirty-four minutes at the 2nd leg of the Strachan Challenge. He also holds the record for the fastest best-of-17 match, beating Joe O'Boye 9–0 in 81 minutes at the 1990 UK Championship. Conversely, he lost 4–13 against Ronnie O'Sullivan in the second round of the 1996 World Championship in just 167 minutes and 33 seconds, an all-time Crucible record and less than 9 minutes per frame. In the 1996 UK Championship he made a century break in just three minutes and thirty-one seconds against John Higgins. In the third round of the 1988 Fidelity Unit Trusts International he won the fifth frame 62–0 in just 3 minutes. In 1995, he made a break of 149 in practice against Nick Manning in a snooker club in West Norwood, London. Drago was left snookered after a foul and potted the brown as a free ball and again as the colour, before potting the fifteen reds with thirteen blacks, a pink and a blue, and all the colours.

Playing style

His combination of exceptionally fast play and emotional temperament has made him a popular character in snooker, although he was famously criticised by Steve Davis for hurling his cue at the table and storming out of the arena following his 1–5 quarterfinal defeat to Mark Bennett in the 1996 Grand Prix, with Drago later accusing his opponent of bad sportsmanship, because the latter had twice in the match suggested that Drago missed the object ball deliberately while snookered. Similarly, he became visibly angry with Peter Ebdon during their second round match in the 2003 World Championship, in which Ebdon repeatedly left the arena between frames. Drago took this as an attempt to disrupt the flow of his game, but apologised publicly when he later found out that Ebdon had been ill during the match.

His style has earned him the nickname "the Tornado".

Performance and rankings timeline

Career finals

Ranking finals: 1

Minor-ranking finals: 1 (1 title)

Non-ranking finals: 8 (1 title)

Team finals: 1

Pro-am finals: 6 (3 titles)

Amateur finals: 3 (2 titles)

Pool tournament wins
 2003 World Pool Masters
 2007 Mosconi Cup 
 2007 Mosconi Cup (MVP) 
 2008 Euro Tour French Open
 2008 Mosconi Cup 
 2008 Predator International 10-ball Championship

References

External links

Tony Drago at worldsnooker.com
Profile on Global Snooker
Profile on World Pool Masters

1965 births
Living people
Maltese snooker players
Maltese pool players
People from Valletta
Competitors at the 2005 World Games